Clifford is an extinct town in Polk County, in the U.S. state of Missouri.

A post office called Clifford was established in 1904, and remained in operation until 1914. According to tradition, a local merchant gave the community the name of his son.

References

Ghost towns in Missouri
Former populated places in Polk County, Missouri